Ornella Wahner (born 19 February 1993) is a German amateur boxer who won gold medals at the 2011 Youth and Junior World Championships and the 2018 World Championships, defeating Sonia Chahal 4–1 in the final to become the first German amateur world champion boxer. She is coached by Michael Timm.

References

External links
 

Living people
1993 births
German women boxers
Featherweight boxers
AIBA Women's World Boxing Championships medalists
European Games competitors for Germany
Boxers at the 2015 European Games
Boxers at the 2019 European Games
Sportspeople from Dresden